Bohumil Modrý (24 September 1916 – 21 July 1963) was a goaltender for the Czechoslovakia men's national ice hockey team which won the silver medal at the 1948 Olympics and the 2 gold medals -  at the 1947 World Championship and at the 1949 World Championship.

Modrý played his club hockey with LTC Praha (LTC Prague), which suffered four defections at the 1948 Spengler Cup in Davos.  He was still a player with LTC Praha, and travelling as a delegate with the 1950 Czechoslovakia national team in March, when he and his teammates were arrested by the communist authorities. Czech national team has been stopped (Saturday, Mar-11) at the Prague Airport while preparing to travel to London to defend their title at the 1950 World Championship tournament (reason: reporter's visas, but it was lie). On Monday Mar-13 they have been arrested after party on Mar-12. Party was provide in the "Gold Pub", U Herclíků, Pštrossova 192/24, 110 00 Praha 1 – Nové Město and personally Modrý was not there. They were frustrated and in the pub they hates communist party (but secret police - STB - was there also).  Some of them were charged with making plans to defect to the West. In October 1950 Modrý and ten other players were convicted of treason . Modrý received the longest sentence, 15 years in prison, as the supposed leader of the potential defection plan (together - 11 people ~ 74 years and 8 months).

Modrý served his prison time in Pankrác Prison in Prague and Bory Prison in Plzeň. He also served some of his time as a forced laborer in the uranium mines in Jáchymov.

Modrý served 5 years of the 15 year sentence, dying in his hometown of Prague 8 years after his release (1955) from incarceration.

References

External links

1916 births
1963 deaths
Ice hockey players at the 1948 Winter Olympics
IIHF Hall of Fame inductees
Medalists at the 1948 Winter Olympics
Olympic ice hockey players of Czechoslovakia
Olympic medalists in ice hockey
Olympic silver medalists for Czechoslovakia
People convicted of treason against Czechoslovakia
Ice hockey people from Prague
Czech ice hockey goaltenders
Czechoslovak ice hockey goaltenders